Catalina Garcia may refer to:

 Catalina García, Colombian lead singer of Monsieur Periné
 Catalina Garcia (1988–2008), American murder victim at the Northern Illinois University shooting